Miramar is a  French neoclassical-style mansion on  bordering Bellevue Avenue on Aquidneck Island at Newport, Rhode Island. Overlooking Rhode Island Sound, it was intended as a summer home for the George D. Widener family of Philadelphia.

History

Miramar was designed by Horace Trumbauer, who had earlier designed the nearby Edward Julius Berwind property, The Elms. The gardens were created by Jacques Gréber.

His widow, Eleanor Elkins Widener, survived the sinking; construction continued in 1913 and 1914 and Eleanor Widener hosted a large reception there on August 20, 1915.

The 27-bedroom, 14-bath mansion has a grand salon and ballroom, 27 feet by 63 feet, on the first floor, which opens onto a  oceanfront terrace. It also features a 10,000-bottle wine cellar with a 20-ft (6 m) stone basin for icing up to 200 bottles of champagne at once.

The design of Miramar was copied from the Boullée/Lacroix east wing of the Élysée Palace in Paris. Carlhian designed the interiors; the furnishings were purchased from Joseph Duveen, 1st Baron Duveen.

The property features includes a  carriage house and gardens with a bronze fountain designed by French sculptor Henri-Léon Gréber, father of the landscape designer.

Owners
The estate was bought by Stephen A. Schwarzman in 2021 for $27 million.

References

External links
 

Houses completed in 1915
Widener family
Houses in Newport, Rhode Island
Gilded Age mansions